P. humilis  may refer to:
 Phacelia humilis, the low phacelia, a plant species native to the western United States 
 Polistes humilis, the common paper wasp, a wasp species found throughout Australia
 Prosopis humilis, a flowering plant species
 Pseudopodoces humilis, the Tibetan ground-tit or Hume's ground-tit, a lark-like bird species found in the north of the Himalayas